Herbert Albert Lewis (April 17, 1905 – January 20, 1991) was a Canadian professional ice hockey left winger who played for the Detroit Red Wings in the National Hockey League. He was born in Calgary, Alberta.

Lewis was one of the fastest skaters of his day. His speed helped the Red Wings win two consecutive Stanley Cups in 1936 and 1937. He was inducted into the Hockey Hall of Fame in 1989.

Career statistics

Regular season and playoffs

* Stanley Cup Champion.

External links

1905 births
1991 deaths
Canadian ice hockey left wingers
Detroit Cougars players
Detroit Falcons players
Detroit Red Wings captains
Detroit Red Wings players
Hockey Hall of Fame inductees
Indianapolis Capitals players
Ice hockey people from Calgary
Stanley Cup champions